Water Street may refer to:

Water Street, Hong Kong
Water Street (constituency) around Water Street, Hong Kong
Water Street, Milwaukee
Water Street, Pennsylvania, an unincorporated village
Water Street (Augusta, Maine)
Water Street (St. John's), Newfoundland and Labrador
Water Street (Tampa), a neighborhood in Tampa, Florida
Water Street, Vancouver, British Columbia
Water Street (poems), a book of poetry by James Merrill
Water Street (album), a 2008 music album by Sweatshop Union

See also
Water Street Music Hall, a concert hall in Rochester, New York
Water Street Mission, rescue mission in Manhattan, New York
55 Water Street, office building in Manhattan, New York